The Hamilton by-election 1959 was a by-election held in the  electorate in Hamilton in the Waikato during the term of the 32nd New Zealand Parliament, on 2 May 1959.

Background
The by-election was caused by the death of incumbent MP Hilda Ross of the National Party on 6 March 1959. The by-election was won by Lance Adams-Schneider, also of the National Party.

Candidates
Labour
There were two candidates for the Labour Party nomination:

Iris Martin, matron of Wellington Hospital and daughter of former Labour cabinet minister Lee Martin

Labour chose Waters as its candidate. Waters had recently been appointed a trustee of the Waikato Savings Bank. Contesting the seat three times prior, he slightly increased Labour share of the vote from 41.63 to 43.16 percent.

National
There were seven candidates for the National Party nomination:

Dorothy Blomfield, a member of the Hamilton City Council
Victor Allan de Lacey, a Hamilton businessman and a member of several National Party executive committees
A. R. Griffiths, a member of the Hamilton City Council and former chairman of the Hamilton National Party
Frances Dewsbury Pinford, the chairman of the Hamilton Fire Board and former Mayor of Hamilton

The local National Party members selected Adams-Schneider as candidate for the seat.

Social Credit
Frederick Charles Roberts, a Hamilton businessman, stood as the candidate for the Social Credit Party. In 1957 he stood for Social Credit in the  electorate.

Results
The following table gives the election results:

Notes

References

Hamilton 1959
1959 elections in New Zealand
Politics of Hamilton, New Zealand
May 1959 events in New Zealand